The Treaty of Wanghia (also known as the Treaty of Wangxia; Treaty of peace, amity, and commerce, between the United States of America and the Chinese Empire) was the first of the unequal treaties imposed by the United States on China. As per the terms of the diplomatic agreement, the United States received the same privileges with China that Great Britain had achieved under the Nanjing Treaty in 1842. The United States received additional privileges as well, including the right to cabotage on preferential terms and the expansion of extraterritoriality. Imperial China's Qing dynasty signed the treaty with the United States on July 3, 1844, in the Kun Iam Temple. The treaty was subsequently passed by the U.S. Congress and ratified by President John Tyler on January 17, 1845. The Treaty of Wanghia was formally in effect until the signing of the 1943 Sino-American Treaty for the Relinquishment of Extraterritorial Rights in China.

Name of the Treaty
The treaty was named after a village in northern Macau where the temple is located, called Mong Ha or Wang Hia. It is now a part of the territory's Our Lady of Fátima Parish.

Treaty contents
The United States was represented by Caleb Cushing, a Massachusetts lawyer dispatched by President John Tyler under pressure from American merchants concerned about British dominance in trade with China. Physician and missionary Peter Parker served as Cushing's Chinese interpreter. The Qing Empire was represented by Keying, the Viceroy of Liangguang, who held responsibility for the provinces of Guangdong and Guangxi.)

The treaty was modeled after the treaties of Nanking and the Bogue between the United Kingdom and China, but differed in being more detailed. Among other things, it contained provisions for:

 Extraterritoriality, where Chinese subjects would be tried and punished under Chinese law and American citizens would be tried and punished under the authority of the American consul or other public functionaries authorized to that effect
 Fixed tariffs on trade in the treaty ports
 The right to buy land in the five treaty ports and erect churches and hospitals there
 The right to learn Chinese by abolishing a law which thitherto forbade foreigners to do so 
 The U.S. received most favored nation status, resulting in the United States receiving the same beneficial treatment China gave to other Western powers, and received the right to modify the treaty after 12 years.

The United States also granted the Chinese Empire powers to confiscate American ships if operating outside treaty ports, and withdrew consular protection in cases where American citizens were trading in opium under articles 3 and 33, respectively. Furthermore, the U.S. agreed to hand over any offenders to China. (Americans entered the opium trade with less expensive but inferior Turkish opium and by 1810 had around 10% of the trade in Canton.)

See also
 Western imperialism in Asia
 Unequal treaty
 China–United States relations

Footnotes

References 

 Dennett, Tyler. Americans in eastern Asia; a critical study of the policy of the United States with reference to China, Japan and Korea in the 19th century (1922) online
 Downs, Jacques M., and Frederic D. Grant Jr. The Golden Ghetto: the American commercial community at canton and the shaping of American China Policy, 1784–1844 (Hong Kong University Press, 2014) online.
 Henson, Jr., Curtis T.  Commissioners and Commodores: The East Indian Squadron and American Diplomacy in China (U of Alabama Press, 1982) 
 Kuo, Ping Chia. "Caleb Cushing and the Treaty of Wanghia, 1844". The Journal of Modern History 5, no. 1 (1933): 34–54. online
 Le Pichon, Alain. "Howqua And the Howqua: how a Chinese monopolist saved American free-traders from financial ruin." Journal of the Royal Asiatic Society Hong Kong Branch 50 (2010): 99–121. online
 Swisher, Earl, ed. China's Management of the American Barbarians; a Study of Sino-American Relations, 1841–1861, with Documents. New Haven, CT: Published for the Far Eastern Association by Far Eastern Publications, Yale University, 1953.
 Welch, Richard E. "Caleb Cushing's Chinese Mission and the Treaty of Wanghia: A Review." Oregon Historical Quarterly 58.4 (1957): 328–357. online

External links
On the negotiations of the treaty, 1844

China–United States relations
Unequal treaties
Treaties of the United States
1844 in China
1844 treaties
Treaties of the Qing dynasty